Roberto Formigoni (born 30 March 1947) is a former Italian politician born in Lecco, Italy. He was the President of Lombardy from 1995 to 2013. He is the former unofficial political spokesperson of the Communion and Liberation movement.

On 21 February 2019, the Supreme Court of Cassation, the highest court in Italy, found him guilty of corruption and sentenced him to a definitive jail term of 5 years and 10 months. As a result, he has been detained in the prison of Bollate, near Milan, Italy, since February 2019.

Career
Roberto Formigoni began his political career early in Christian Democracy, through youth movements such as Gioventù Studentesca and Communion and Liberation (of which he became the unofficial political spokesman). In 1976, he founded the Popular Movement and was elected a deputy in both the European Parliament (with over 450,000 votes) and Parliament of Italy. He was also the vice-president of the European Parliament for five years and served as under-secretary for the Environment in the Italian government.

In 1990, he garnered attention when he was involved in a mission to Iraq which successfully concluded with the freeing of some Italian technicians who were hostages of the local government. He later took part in the Oil-for-food programme for Iraq, buying 1,000,000 oil barrels (160,000 cubic metres). The move sparked controversy and linked him to alleged bribe scandals. In 1995, he and Rocco Buttiglione founded the United Christian Democrats party. In 1998, he moved to Forza Italia, when Buttiglione briefly decided to support the government of Massimo D'Alema.

He was elected President of Lombardy in 1995. Leftist groups opposed his center-right platform. President Formigoni was re-elected in 2000 carrying over 62% of the approximately 3.5 million votes, and in 2005.

He was elected to a fourth term in March 2010. His candidature had been contested by academics and left-wing politicians, as in disregard of Law n. 165/2004, that put a limit of two consecutive mandates to directly elected Regional presidents. Formigoni was indirectly elected in 1995, but then directly elected in 2000 and 2005. He defended himself, stating that the law was not in vigour when he was first directly elected in 2000, so he should be allowed a 4th mandate. According to some scholars, his mandate may be overturned by judges later on.

Controversies
Roberto Formigoni candidated the Italian showgirl Nicole Minetti and dental hygienist of the former Italian Prime Minister Silvio Berlusconi, who asked for a political seat for her and this was contested by Italian newspapers.
On 16 October 2012, Formigoni announced the dissolution of the regional legislature after one of his commissioners, Domenico Zambetti of the People of Freedom was arrested on accusations he bought votes from the 'Ndrangheta in 2010 and extorted favours and public building contracts, including construction tenders for the World Expo 2015 in Milan.

Italian Courts Trials Sentences against Roberto Formigoni

2000s Bribery and environmental pollution
Roberto Formigoni has been judged on 2002 due bribery due the landfill in Cerro Maggiore, Italy.
Roberto Formigoni has been processed through the Italian Courts due illegal environmental pollution in December 2009.

2010s: Freemasonry and defamatory behavior against Italian judges
Roberto Formigoni was interrogated by Italian Court in Rome due the Propaganda 2 freemasonry group.

Roberto Formigoni has been condemned for 1 year of imprisonment due defamation issues on 12 July 2012.
Roberto Formigoni has been condemned due bribery on 25 July 2012 by Italian courts.
On 12 February 2013 he has been investigated due criminal group activities. On 3 March 2014 Roberto Formigoni has been condemned for criminal association activities and bribery.
On 15 April 2016 Roberto Formigoni has been condemned for 9 years and he has been considered by the Italian Courts "Boss of criminal group" due his tactical bribery attitudes that lasted more than 10 years while he managed more than 70 million euro public money.

Roberto Formigoni has been condemned due defamation of the Italian judge Alfredo Robledo.

See also 
 1995 Lombard regional election
 2000 Lombard regional election
 2005 Lombard regional election
 2010 Lombard regional election
 Communion and Liberation
 Advocacy group

References

External links 

 

1947 births
Living people
People from Lecco
Italian Roman Catholics
Christian Democracy (Italy) politicians
Italian People's Party (1994) politicians
United Christian Democrats politicians
Forza Italia politicians
The People of Freedom politicians
New Centre-Right politicians
Popular Alternative politicians
Deputies of Legislature X of Italy
Deputies of Legislature XI of Italy
Deputies of Legislature XII of Italy
Senators of Legislature XV of Italy
Senators of Legislature XVI of Italy
Senators of Legislature XVII of Italy
Presidents of Lombardy
Members of the Italian Senate from Lombardy
MEPs for Italy 1984–1989
MEPs for Italy 1989–1994
Università Cattolica del Sacro Cuore alumni
Communion and Liberation
Heads of government who were later imprisoned
Italian politicians convicted of crimes